Francis Idriss Ambane Moubourou (born November 8, 1984 in Douala) is a Cameroonian professional footballer, who last played for Gokulam Kerala FC in the I-League.

Career
Ambane started his professional club career with Elite One outfit Canon Yaoundé, where he appeared in 14 league matches and scored 7 goals. He was in Yaoundé's 2002 Super Coupe Roger Milla Runners-up squad. 

He later moved to KSC Lokeren a Belgian association football club in 2003–2004 season. After just one season Ambane returned to Cameroon and joined another MTN Elite one club Union Douala. He spent 3 seasons there before he returned to his youth club Canon Yaoundé. In 2009–2010 Ambane Francis was sold to ES Sétif.

On July 14, 2011, Ambane signed a two-year contract with ASO Chlef, joining them on a free transfer from ES Sétif after terminating his contract with the club. On January 19, 2012, Ambane signed a One year contract with WA Tlemcen, joining them on a free transfer from ASO Chlef

With ES Sétif, he won the 2009–10 Algerian Cup. He was also in Sétif's Algerian Ligue Professionnelle 1 and 2009 CAF Confederation Cup Runners-up squad.

On October 11, 2017, newly formed I-League side Gokulam Kerala FC announced that they have secured services of Ambane for the 2017–18 I-League season. Gokulam finished 7th in the season and Ambané has appeared in only 4 league matches for "the Malabarians". On 14 January, he was released by the club.

International career
Ambané has represented Cameroon U23 in 7 matches, scoring 2 goals. He featured with the Cameroon  2004 Olympic team in Athens. 

Ambane was the only home base that was selected 3 times for the Cameroon national team games in 2006–2007. He made his senior international debut on 23 December 2012 against Niger in a 1-0 friendly win.

He has also represented Cameroon in the 2016 African Nations Championship, where they lost 3-0 to Ivory Coast in the Quarter-finals.

Honours

Club
Canon Yaoundé
Super Coupe Roger Milla
 Runners-up (1): 2002
ES Sétif
Algerian Ligue Professionnelle 1
 Runners-up (1): 2009–10
Algerian Cup
 Champions (1): 2009–10
CAF Confederation Cup
 Runners-up (1): 2009

References

External links

Cameroonian footballers
ES Sétif players
Cameroonian Christians
1984 births
Living people
Cameroonian expatriate sportspeople in Algeria
Cameroonian expatriate sportspeople in Belgium
Expatriate footballers in Algeria
Expatriate footballers in Belgium
ASO Chlef players
WA Tlemcen players
Canon Yaoundé players
Union Douala players
K.S.C. Lokeren Oost-Vlaanderen players
Association football midfielders
Cameroonian expatriate footballers
Expatriate footballers in India
Cameroonian expatriate sportspeople in India
2016 African Nations Championship players
Footballers from Douala
Cameroon A' international footballers